Nicholas Kao Se Tseien O.C.S.O. (15 January 1897 – 11 December 2007), was a Chinese Trappist priest living in Hong Kong who had been the oldest living Catholic priest and also the oldest person ever to have had a cataract operation according to the Guinness Book of World Records.

Biography
Born in Fuzhou, Fujian province, one of four brothers, Kao studied law at Xiamen University and later converted to Catholicism at the age of 18 while attending a school run by Spanish Dominican friars. He was trained as a teacher and studied law at night, but he ultimately decided to become a priest.

His life spanned parts of three centuries, two Emperors of China, and ten papacies. He stated that in 1912 he voted for Sun Yat Sen as China's president. His clerical life would bring him from China to Taiwan, Malaysia, and finally Hong Kong.

In 1972, he was at the Cathedral of the Immaculate Conception. He lived a cloistered life, but regularly shared advice for a healthy and long life. He gave visitors a list of "Healthy Seven Nos": no smoking; no anger; no alcohol; no overeating; constant exercise; constant prayer; no rudeness. He was devoted to the Blessed Virgin Mary throughout his life — he would say the Rosary many times each day, and built six shrines to her in Taiwan, Mainland China, Malaysia and Hong Kong.

He stayed at Our Lady of Joy Abbey at Lantau Island for more than 30 years, where he died peacefully in his sleep on the morning of 11 December 2007, at the age of 110 years and 330 days. His body was buried in the Monastery's private graveyard.

See also

 Aging
 Longevity
 Oldest people

References

External links
  Reportage at Vatican Radio, 18 January 2007
 Fr Kao's photo on The Standard
 Fr Kao's Memorial Webpage
 Fr Kao's Memorial Blog

1897 births
2007 deaths
Chinese supercentenarians
Men supercentenarians
Converts to Roman Catholicism
20th-century Chinese Roman Catholic priests
Hong Kong Roman Catholic priests
Chinese expatriates in Hong Kong
Trappists